Piantón is one of six parishes in Vegadeo, a municipality within the province and autonomous community of Asturias, in northern Spain.

Villages and hamlets 
 Castromourán
 El Chao de Porzún
 A Cova
 Folgueiras
 Montouto
 Piantón
 Porzún
 Veiga de Vilar
 Vesedo
 Vilameitide

References

Parishes in Vegadeo